Michael Anthony Grant (born August 4, 1972) is an American professional boxer and world heavyweight title challenger. Grant’s pinnacle of his boxing career came in 2000 when he unsuccessfully challenged Lennox Lewis for the IBF, WBC and IBO heavyweight titles. He came in undefeated but was knocked out in two rounds by the eventual champion. He also held fringe titles in the IBC and WBF during this period.

Early life
Before his boxing career, he blossomed into a three-sport star at Chicago's Harper High School. He was a right handed pitcher who drew attention from the Kansas City Royals, an imposing two-way player at tight end and defensive end on the football field and a front court force on the basketball court. Grant graduated in 1991 and went on to play American Football at Mount San Antonio College near Los Angeles, and Fullerton College in Orange County, California.

Amateur career
Grant had just 12 amateur fights. In the Golden Gloves 1994 semi-finals he suffered his only amateur loss to Derrick Jefferson on points.

Professional career

Early career
In his early career, Grant beat Corey Sanders, Ross Puritty, Lionel Butler, Al Cole, Jorge Luis Gonzalez, David Izon and Obed Sullivan. The 1997 Al Cole win earned him the fringe IBC title. Grant made defenses against Jorge Luis Gonzalez, David Izon and Obed Sullivan. In 1999 Michael beat Ahmed Abdin to earn the NABF title, then defeated Lou Savarese. His last fight before the title shot was against Andrew Golota in a WBC eliminator, touching the canvas twice but winning by stoppage in the tenth round after a knockdown when Golota refused to continue.

World title challenge

Grant's undefeated record and victories against Sullivan, Savarese and Golota earned him an opportunity to challenge newly crowned undisputed heavyweight champion Lennox Lewis. Lewis was coming off a unanimous decision victory against Evander Holyfield and wanted to make a statement with his first title-defence.

Grant started the fight very aggressively but Lewis put him down with a right hand. He got back to his feet and was beaten badly by Lewis, a left hand on the side of the head sending Grant reeling into the corner and counting as a second knockdown. Grant was badly hurt but seemed to recover toward the end of the first round until a vicious right hand sent him down for the third time. Remarkably Grant beat the count. His trainer Don Turner implored him to use his legs. While Grant tried to rally, Lewis took his time in round two before finishing Grant off with an uppercut.

Later career
Sidelined by injuries for fifteen months, in his comeback fight Grant fought and lost to Jameel McCline in 2001. McCline  knocked him down in the first round, and Grant had to retire due to a broken ankle. After a brief comeback, then-undefeated Dominick Guinn knocked him out in 2003 in seven rounds. Since the loss, Grant has fought sporadically against limited opposition while having several high-profile trainers, including Don Turner, Teddy Atlas, Buddy McGirt and most recently Eddie Mustafa Muhammad.

On May 7, 2010, Grant fought for the first time in eighteen months and won by first-round technical knockout over Kevin Burnett at Oheka Castle, Huntingdon, NY.

On August 21, 2010, with a 20 kg weight advantage, Grant was physically dominant, but lost on points to Tomasz Adamek by a unanimous decision.

On March 11, 2011, Grant fought Tye Fields at the Planet Hollywood Resort and Casino in Las Vegas. Grant scored a one-punch third-round knockout.

On November 19, 2011, Grant faced Francois Botha for the vacant World Boxing Federation (WBF) Heavyweight title. Grant won by a 12th-round KO, having needed a KO due to being well behind on all three cards. The fight took place in Johannesburg, South Africa, the first time he had fought outside the USA. Immediately after the fight, Grant called out the Klitschko brothers who hold all of the major heavyweight titles. After an 18-month layoff, Grant defended the WBF belt against France-based Cameroonian Carlos Takam on May 24, 2013, in Noisy-le-Grand, France, losing by 8th-round technical knockout.

It was announced in July 2017 that Grant would face Dillian Whyte at the Pinnacle Bank Arena in Lincoln, Nebraska on August 19, however the fight was scrapped after a backlash from fans, and Dillian would face Malcolm Tann instead.

Professional boxing record

{|class="wikitable" style="text-align:center; font-size:95%"
|-
!
!Result
!Record
!Opponent
!Type
!Round, time
!Date
!Location
!Notes
|-
|55
|Loss
|48–7
|align=left| Krzysztof Zimnoch
|KO
|2 (8), 
|Apr 22, 2017
|align=left|
|align=left|
|-
|54
|Loss
|48–6
|align=left| Manuel Charr
|RTD
|5 (10), 
|Oct 24, 2014
|align=left| 
|align=left|
|-
|53
|Loss
|48–5
|align=left| Carlos Takam
|TKO
|8 (12), 
|May 24, 2013
|align=left| 
|align=left|
|-
|52
|Win
|48–4
|align=left| Francois Botha
|KO
|12 (12), 
|Nov 19, 2011
|align=left| 
|align=left|
|-
|51
|Win
|47–4
|align=left| Tye Fields
|KO
|3 (10), 
|Mar 11, 2011
|align=left| 
|align=left|
|-
|50
|Loss
|46–4
|align=left| Tomasz Adamek
|UD
|12
|Aug 21, 2010
|align=left| 
|align=left|
|-
|49
|Win
|46–3
|align=left| Kevin Burnett
|TKO
|1 (8), 
|May 7, 2010
|align=left| 
|align=left|
|-
|48
|Win
|45–3
|align=left| Paul Marinaccio
|UD
|12
|Nov 15, 2008
|align=left| 
|align=left|
|-
|47
|Win
|44–3
|align=left| Demetrice King
|UD
|8
|Jul 11, 2008
|align=left| 
|align=left|
|-
|46
|Win
|43–3
|align=left| Kevin Montiy
|TKO
|7 (8), 
|Sep 5, 2007
|align=left| 
|align=left|
|-
|45
|Win
|42–3
|align=left| Billy Zumbrun
|TKO
|5 (8), 
|Jun 27, 2007
|align=left| 
|align=left|
|-
|44
|Win
|41–3
|align=left| Marcus McGee
|UD
|8
|Jun 24, 2005
|align=left| 
|align=left|
|-
|43
|Win
|40–3
|align=left| Wallace McDaniel
|TKO
|8, (8) 
|Apr 8, 2005
|align=left| 
|align=left|
|-
|42
|Win
|39–3
|align=left| Charles Hatcher
|TKO
|8 (8), 
|Feb 21, 2004
|align=left| 
|align=left|
|-
|41
|Loss
|38–3
|align=left| Dominick Guinn
|TKO
|7 (10), 
|Jun 7, 2003
|align=left| 
|align=left|
|-
|40
|Win
|38–2
|align=left| Gilbert Martinez
|TKO
|8 (10), 
|Apr 18, 2003
|align=left| 
|align=left|
|-
|39
|Win
|37–2
|align=left| Carlton Johnson
|TKO
|5 (10)
|Jan 24, 2003
|align=left| 
|align=left|
|-
|38
|Win
|36–2
|align=left| James Walton
|TKO
|4 (10)
|Nov 7, 2002
|align=left| 
|align=left|
|-
|37
|Win
|35–2
|align=left| Robert Davis
|TKO
|3 (10), 
|Aug 3, 2002
|align=left| 
|align=left|
|-
|36
|Win
|34–2
|align=left| Anthony Willis
|TKO
|2 (10), 
|Jun 1, 2002
|align=left| 
|align=left|
|-
|35
|Win
|33–2
|align=left| Joe Lenhart
|TKO
|5 (8), 
|Apr 13, 2002
|align=left| 
|align=left|
|-
|34
|Win
|32–2
|align=left| Reynaldo Minus
|TKO
|4 (8), 
|Mar 9, 2002
|align=left| 
|align=left|
|-
|33
|Loss
|31–2
|align=left| Jameel McCline
|TKO
|1 (10), 
|Jul 21, 2001
|align=left| 
|align=left|
|-
|32
|Loss
|31–1
|align=left| Lennox Lewis
|KO
|2 (12), 
|Apr 29, 2000
|align=left| 
|align=left|
|-
|31
|Win
|31–0
|align=left| Andrew Golota
|TKO
|10 (12), 
|Nov 20, 1999
|align=left| 
|align=left|
|-
|30
|Win
|30–0
|align=left| Lou Savarese
|UD
|10
|Jun 19, 1999
|align=left| 
|align=left|
|-
|29
|Win
|29–0
|align=left| Ahmed Abdin
|RTD
|10 (12), 
|Jan 30, 1999
|align=left| 
|align=left|
|-
|28
|Win
|28–0
|align=left| Obed Sullivan
|TKO
|9 (12), 
|May 30, 1998
|align=left| 
|align=left|
|-
|27
|Win
|27–0
|align=left| David Izon
|TKO
|5 (12), 
|Jan 17, 1998
|align=left| 
|align=left|
|-
|26
|Win
|26–0
|align=left| Jorge Luis Gonzalez
|TKO
|1 (12), 
|Nov 7, 1997
|align=left| 
|align=left|
|-
|25
|Win
|25–0
|align=left| Alfred Cole
|RTD
|10 (12), 
|Jun 20, 1997
|align=left| 
|align=left|
|-
|24
|Win
|24–0
|align=left| Lionel Butler
|DQ
|4 (10), 
|Apr 19, 1997
|align=left| 
|align=left|
|-
|23
|Win
|23–0
|align=left| Jeff Wooden
|SD
|10
|Mar 14, 1997
|align=left| 
|align=left|
|-
|22
|Win
|22–0
|align=left| Ray Anis
|UD
|10
|Dec 6, 1996
|align=left| 
|align=left|
|-
|21
|Win
|21–0
|align=left| Louis Monaco
|TKO
|3 (?)
|Oct 6, 1996
|align=left| 
|align=left|
|-
|20
|Win
|20–0
|align=left| Ross Puritty
|UD
|10
|Jul 21, 1996
|align=left| 
|align=left|
|-
|19
|Win
|19–0
|align=left| Ed Donaldson
|TKO
|3 (10), 
|Jun 11, 1996
|align=left| 
|align=left|
|-
|18
|Win
|18–0
|align=left| Olian Alexander
|TKO
|4 (4)
|May 10, 1996
|align=left| 
|align=left|
|-
|17
|Win
|17–0
|align=left| Corey Sanders
|TKO
|2 (8), 
|Mar 15, 1996
|align=left| 
|align=left|
|-
|16
|Win
|16–0
|align=left| Rick Sullivan
|TKO
|1 (6)
|Jan 30, 1996
|align=left| 
|align=left|
|-
|15
|Win
|15–0
|align=left| Bradley Rone
|UD
|6
|Mar 12, 1996
|align=left| 
|align=left|
|-
|14
|Win
|14–0
|align=left| Mike Dixon
|TKO
|6 (?), 
|Dec 7, 1995
|align=left| 
|align=left|
|-
|13
|Win
|13–0
|align=left| Tim Noble
|TKO
|2 (6)
|Nov 10, 1995
|align=left| 
|align=left|
|-
|12
|Win
|12–0
|align=left| Stanley Wright
|TKO
|2 (10)
|Sep 22, 1995
|align=left| 
|align=left|
|-
|11
|Win
|11–0
|align=left| Lou Turchiarelli
|TKO
|1 (8), 
|May 20, 1995
|align=left| 
|align=left|
|-
|10
|Win
|10–0
|align=left| Tyrone Dixon
|TKO
|1 (?)
|Dec 6, 1994
|align=left| 
|align=left|
|-
|9
|Win
|9–0
|align=left| Danny Wofford
|PTS
|8
|Dec 3, 1994
|align=left| 
|align=left|
|-
|8
|Win
|8–0
|align=left| Steve Edwards
|DQ
|5 (6), 
|Nov 5, 1994
|align=left| 
|align=left|
|-
|7
|Win
|7–0
|align=left| John Basil Jackson
|UD
|4
|Nov 1, 1994
|align=left| 
|align=left|
|-
|6
|Win
|6–0
|align=left| Carlton Brown
|KO
|1 (?)
|Oct 22, 1994
|align=left| 
|align=left|
|-
|5
|Win
|5–0
|align=left| Ed Strickland
|KO
|1 (?)
|Oct 4, 1994
|align=left| 
|align=left|
|-
|4
|Win
|4–0
|align=left| Elvin Evans
|TKO
|6 (?)
|Sep 23, 1994
|align=left| 
|align=left|
|-
|3
|Win
|3–0
|align=left| Frankie Hines
|KO
|1 (?)
|Sep 6, 1994
|align=left| 
|align=left|
|-
|2
|Win
|2–0
|align=left| Jerome Jones
|TKO
|2 (?)
|Aug 7, 1994
|align=left| 
|align=left|
|-
|1
|Win
|1–0
|align=left| Ernest English
|TKO
|1 (4)
|Jul 21, 1994
|align=left| 
|
|-align=center

References

External links
 

|-

|-

1972 births
Living people
American male boxers
Boxers from Chicago
Heavyweight boxers